and/OAR is an independent record label based in Seattle, Washington. It was founded by Dale Lloyd in 2001 but officially started in May 2002. The label concentrates on raising awareness about field recording and sound art that uses field recording as part of the creative process. From 2001 to 2005, and/OAR released compilations for Phonography.org, a website about field recording.

The label has tried to present sonic phenomena that have rarely been heard and rarely if ever been released on CD, such as the wind of the Patagonia region of South America, singing sand in Japan, booming sand in Mongolia, plumbing apparatuses in southeast Asia, physics labs at Harvard University, Christmas tree lights, and electric fish.

The label's roster includes Arve Henriksen, Francisco López, Maggi Payne, Andrew Deutsch, Taku Sugimoto, Steve Roden, Bernhard Günter, and Arsenije Jovanović.

and/OAR  has three label series as well as several sub-series of releases. and/OAR is considered the main label series. either/OAR was started in 2009 to explore instrument-based, avant-garde, improvised music and composed music. mOAR was founded in 2008 to explore genre-blurring electronic music

Roster
 Kyle Bruckmann
 Celer
 Christopher DeLaurenti
 Jim Denley
 Taylor Deupree
 Andrew Deutsch
 Gintas K
 Kraig Grady
 Arve Henriksen
 Francisco Lopez
 Kim Myhr
 Maggi Payne

References

 DeLaurenti, Christopher (June 19–25, 2003) "Experimental Music Almanac - Everything You Need to Know (and Would Ever Want to Know) about Experimental Music in Seattle" The Stranger.
 Seven, Richard (September 30, 2007) "Aural Auteurs | The Sonic Artists of the Seattle Phonographers Union" The Seattle Times (Music & Nightlife Section).
 15 Questions to Dale Lloyd of and/OAR
 Dale Lloyd Interview
 allrecordlabel.com listing

External links
 Official site

American independent record labels
Record labels established in 2002
Experimental music record labels
Electronic music record labels
2002 establishments in Washington (state)